Kashku (also Romanized as Kashkū; also known as Kashkū’īyeh, Kashkuyeh, Khushku, and Khvoshkūh) is a village in Shamil Rural District, Takht District, Bandar Abbas County, Hormozgan Province, Iran. At the 2006 census, its population was 1,118, in 255 families.

References 

Populated places in Bandar Abbas County